Itirapuã is a municipality in the state of São Paulo in Brazil. The population is 6,543 (2020 est.) in an area of 161 km². The elevation is 865 m.

References

Municipalities in São Paulo (state)